The Light Wing AC4 is a Swiss ultralight and light-sport aircraft, designed by Hans Gygax and produced by Light Wing AG of Stans. The aircraft was publicly introduced at the AERO Friedrichshafen show in 2013. It is supplied complete and ready-to-fly.

Design and development
The AC4 was designed to comply with the Fédération Aéronautique Internationale microlight rules and US light-sport aircraft rules. It features a strut-braced high-wing, with "V"-struts and jury struts, a two-seats-in-side-by-side configuration enclosed cockpit, fixed tricycle landing gear and a single engine in tractor configuration.

The aircraft is made from a combination of composites and aluminum sheet, with its tailboom made from a single large diameter aluminium tube and the wings and tail surfaces covered in aluminium. The standard engine available is the  Rotax 912ULS or Rotax 912iS four-stroke powerplant.

The AC4 can accommodate one pilot and one passenger and was also designed for aero-towing gliders. It can also accommodate a stretcher for Medevac missions. It received European European Aviation Safety Agency type certification to the Certification Specification for Light Sport Aeroplanes (CS-LSA) on 6 August 2015.

Specifications (AC4 LSA)

References

External links

2000s Swiss ultralight aircraft
Light-sport aircraft
Single-engined tractor aircraft